Nicolas Minorsky (born Nikolai Fyodorovich Minorsky, ; , Korcheva, Russian Empire  – 31 July 1970, Italy) was a Russian American control theory mathematician, engineer and applied scientist. He is best known for his theoretical analysis and first proposed application of PID controllers in the automatic steering systems for U.S. Navy ships.

Career
He was educated at the Nikolaev Maritime Academy in St. Petersburg, graduating in 1908 and commissioned as a lieutenant in the Imperial Russian Navy. From 1908 to 1911 he studied in the Electrical Engineering Department at the University of Nancy, graduating with the degree Ingénieur Électricien. In 1912 he received his Licence ès Sciences from the University of Nancy. He then returned to St. Petersburg and studied at the Imperator's Petersburg Institute of Technology, receiving a degree in Electro-Mechanical Engineering in 1914. After graduating he served in the fleet from 1914 to 1916. From 1916 to 1917 Minorsky was Superintendent of gyro-compasses and lecturer on gyroscopic phenomena and applications at the Nikolaev Maritime Academy. While there he invented the gyrometer, an angular velocity indicator, and in tests compared it to the sensitivity of the human eye in detecting angular velocities.

For a year in 1917 to 1918 he was the adjunct Naval Attache at the Russian Embassy to France in Paris.  In the midst of the Russian civil war Minorsky emigrated to the United States in June 1918.

From 1918 to 1922 Minorsky worked as an assistant to C. P. Steinmetz at the General Electric Research Laboratory in Schenectady, New York. In 1922 Minorsky helped in the installation and testing of automatic steering on board the battleship USS New Mexico. In relation to this work Minorsky authored a paper introducing the concept of Integral and Derivative Control. This paper is one of the earliest formal discussions on control theory in the English language.  Today, this analysis is considered as pioneering and fundamental to control theory as work by James Clerk Maxwell, Edward John Routh, and Adolf Hurwitz.

From 1924 to 1934 Nicolas Minorsky was a Professor of Electronics and Applied Physics at the University of Pennsylvania.  He received his PhD in physics from Penn in 1929.

Upon request of the United States Department of the Navy, the National Academy of Sciences established a committee chaired by William F. Durand to investigate anti-rolling devices on ships.  The ability to stabilize a ship such as an aircraft carrier would be extremely useful during the landing of airplanes. The committee established an experimental laboratory at the Brooklyn Navy Yard.   Minorsky worked on roll stabilization of ships for the navy from 1934 to 1940, designing in 1938 an activated-tank stabilization system into a 5-ton model ship.  A full-scale version of the system was tested in the  but exhibited control stability problems.  Very promising results were beginning to appear when the outbreak of the Second World War interrupted further development as the Hamilton was called to active duty and the 5 ton model was put into storage.

At this time Minorsky became interested in nonlinear mechanics.

From 1940 to 1946 he was special consultant to the Director of the David Taylor Model Basin, continuing his investigations of active ship stabilization as well as anti-submarine warfare.

In 1946 he moved to California to the Division of Engineering Mechanics at Stanford University, where he continued his work on ship stabilization. The 5 ton model was moved from the David Taylor Model Basin to Stanford where it was dubbed the "USS Minorsky".

In her memorial paper to Nicolas Minorsky published in the IEEE Transactions On Automatic Control, author Irmgard Flügge-Lotz stated that Minorsky's greatest contribution to the development of nonlinear mechanics in the U.S. was Minorsky's early recognition that important papers in the field were being published in the Soviet Union in a language that few American researchers could read. In 1947 Minorsky published a book of new Russian developments titled "Introduction to non-linear mechanics: Topological methods, analytical methods, non-linear resonance, relaxation oscillations".

After retirement Nicolas Minorsky and his French born wife, Madeline (Palisse) moved to southern France and settled in the foothills of the Pyrenees. Minorsky continued to work, giving seminars and lectures in Europe, authoring theoretical papers until the end of his life in 1970.

Awards
1955 Montyon Prize of the French Academy of Science.

Bibliography

A list of selected works:

Books
 
 
 Minorsky, N. (1962). Nonlinear Oscillations. D. Van Nostrand Company, Inc., Princenton, New Jersey. pp. 714.

Papers

Patents

References

1885 births
1970 deaths
Engineers from the Russian Empire
Russian electrical engineers
Emigrants from the Russian Empire to the United States
Saint Petersburg State Institute of Technology alumni
Nancy-Université alumni
American electrical engineers
20th-century Russian physicists